This is a list of manhua, or Chinese comics, ordered by year then alphabetical order, and shown with region and author.  It contains a collection manhua magazines, pictorial collections as well as newspapers.

Hong Kong / China

1800s

1900s

1910s

1920s

1930s

1940s

1950s

1960s

1970s

1980s

1990s

2000s

2010s

Singapore

Taiwan

Newspapers with Manhua

Manhua Reviews

Unsorted
 The Adventures of Chi Xue
 Black Leopard
 Chronicles of the Vampire Hunter
 Para Para story involving the dance Para Para
 Saint Legend
 Ying Xiong Wu Lei, a wuxia manhua comics by Ma Wing Shing, based on Ying Xiong Wu Lei of Gu Long
 Shaolin Soccer based on the film of the same title
 Warlord, science-fiction manhua by Tang Chi Fai, Wan Yuet Leung, sequel of Sea Tiger I - III.
 Saint a different version of the journey to the West of Sun Wukong and his party, authored by Khoo Fuk Lung
 SNK vs Capcom based on the game SNK vs Capcom 
 Story of the Tao
 Top Speed
 Young and Dangerous 《古惑仔》 (xxxx) depicted a triad living style; later became a movie franchise in the mid 1990s
 Crouching Tiger Hidden Dragon based on the film of the same title
 The Four Constables
 Heaven Sword & Dragon Sabre based on the book of the same title
 Hero based on the film of the same title
 King of Fighters based on the game King of Fighters
 Return of the Condor Heroes (Legendary Couple) based on the book of the same title
 Weapon of the Gods
Digimon: Digital Monsters

See also
List of Lianhuanhua

External links
Fluid Friction Comics
King Comics
25+ Best Romance Manhua
Jonesky Publishing / Comics World

References

Lists of comics by country
Manhua
Manhua